Moses Sichone (born 31 May 1977) is a retired professional footballer who played as a defender. A Zambian international, he spent most of his career with German clubs.

Career
Sichone joined the squad of Kickers Offenbach in June 2007. After ten years in Germany he left the country on 20 July 2009 and signed for AEP Paphos FC. On 12 July 2010, Sichone signed a one-year contract in the 3. Liga for FC Carl Zeiss Jena. His contract was not renewed and he left the club on 30 June 2011.

International career
He was part of the Zambian 2000 African Nations Cup team, who finished third in group C in the first round of competition, thus failing to secure qualification for the quarter-finals.

Notes

External links
 

1977 births
Living people
People from Mufulira
Association football defenders
Zambian footballers
Zambia international footballers
Zambian expatriate footballers
1. FC Köln players
Alemannia Aachen players
Kickers Offenbach players
VfR Aalen players
Nchanga Rangers F.C. players
FC Carl Zeiss Jena players
AEP Paphos FC players
Bundesliga players
2. Bundesliga players
3. Liga players
Cypriot First Division players
Expatriate footballers in Germany
Expatriate footballers in Cyprus
1998 African Cup of Nations players
2000 African Cup of Nations players
2002 African Cup of Nations players